Amélie Mirkowitch (born 23 June 1942) is a French former swimmer. She competed in the women's 200 metre breaststroke at the 1960 Summer Olympics.

References

External links
 

1942 births
Living people
Olympic swimmers of France
Swimmers at the 1960 Summer Olympics
Sportspeople from Meurthe-et-Moselle
French female breaststroke swimmers